Indian criminal law is the law relating to criminal conduct in India.

Divisions
Indian criminal laws are divided into three major acts i.e. Indian Penal Code, 1860, Code of Criminal Procedure, 1973, and Indian Evidence Act, 1872. Indian Penal Code is a Substantive Law that defines rights and duties etc. Code of Criminal Procedure defines the rules with which substantive laws can be enforced. Besides these major acts, special Criminal Laws are also passed by the Indian Parliament, i.e., NDPS, Prevention of Corruption Act, Food Adulteration Act, Dowry Prohibition Act, The Defence of India Act, etc. thousands of minor laws are made in India.

History
The Indian Penal Code, formulated by the British during the British Raj in 1860, forms the backbone of criminal law in India. Jury trials were abolished by the government in 1960 on the grounds they would be susceptible to media and public influence. This decision was based on an 8-1 acquittal of Kawas Nanavati in K. M. Nanavati vs. State of Maharashtra, which was overturned by higher courts.

The Indian Penal Code was drafted the first law commission under the chairmanship of Lord Macaulay in 1837. Jurists, judges, and professors made revisions in 1850, presented in legislative council in 1856, passed in 1860, and was enforced in 1862. Lord Macaulay issued clarification for the people of India for implementation of this Code, because people were of the view that rule of Capital Punishment will be misused against them. Further more people were against foreign rule on Indian people. Indian Penal Code has been praised to be far-sighted, masterpiece of a law, with almost all kinds of crimes that can be committed by a human, being included in it in one go. It has been thoroughly embedded in the Indian conscience

Issues with IPC 

 Colonial ideas prevail in the code.
 Some laws don't reflect the aspirations of India's liberal Constitution.
 It does not recognize individual agency of citizens of free India
 Too many laws promote patriarchal attitudes, biased against women
 Sedition laws are misused by the state.
 Tech crimes, cyber crimes, sexual offences need to be defined.
 Risk of excessive policing, which leads to harassment of people.
 Need to harmonise statute books with court rulings, which have often expanded the rights of people.
 Accused people are burdened with institutional delay. 
 According to Malimath Committee report, it weighed in favour of the accused and did not adequately focus on justice to the victims of crime.
 Some provisions are disadvantageous for the underprivileged who are trapped in jail for long, but favour the powerful, who get bail very easily.
 In some cases, such as lynching, the maximum sentence or fine is not mentioned, and there is judges' discretion, etc, so the punishment may vary according to a different circumstances.
 Adhering CrPC may be too complex and slow, which needs to be amended before amending the IPC.
 The influence of media trials on the judiciary while using the IPC.

Recent Progress 
Malimath Committee had faced criticism for its drawbacks, among them a suggestion that the standard of evidence be reduced from “beyond reasonable doubt” to “clear and convincing”. In the winter session of parliament, Minister of State for Home Affairs Ajay Kumar Mishra said the committee had been "constituted under the chairpersonship of the Vice Chancellor, National Law University, Delhi to suggest reforms in the criminal laws". He further said that the suggestions that will be received and the report of the committee will be examined by the Ministry of Home Affairs in consultation with all stakeholders.

References